Union Culturelle et Sportive des Travailleurs Port Autonome is a Senegalese football club based in Dakar.  Their home stadium is Stade Port Autonome.  The club is named after the city and country's main shipping port the Autonomous Port of Dakar, it is also the ninth-busiest port in Africa.

Port Autonome also is ninth in the number of major honours won in Senegal numbering five, shared with ASC Linguère of Saint-Louis and Djambars FC.

History
Their first title was won in 1990 and won their second straight in 1991.  Their third and recent was in 2005.  Port Autonome's first cup final appearance was in 1990 and faced ASC Linguère and lost 1–0.  Their first and only cup title was won in 2000 after defeating ASC Saloum of Kaolack 4–0; this was Port Autonome's recent cup final appearance. Also in the same year they won their only Assemblée Nationale Cup.

The club was relegated in the 2010 season to the Senegal Ligue 2.  They returned again to Ligue 1 in 2013 and remained until they were relegated in the 2014–15 season after finishing last with 20 points, eight behind AS Pikine and with 14 losses.

Port Autonome's first appearance in the League Cup was in 2009.  The club advanced up to the quarterfinals and lost to AS Douanes 2–0.  In the 2010 edition, the club advanced up to the semis and lost to ASC Diaraf 2–0.  For a short time in late 2013, Casa Sport shared the number of honors won with Port Autonome; up to that time, Porto Autonome was ranked eighth.

Achievements
Senegal Premier League: 3
1990, 1991, 2005

Senegal FA Cup: 1
2000

Senegal Assemblée Nationale Cup: 1
2000

League and cup history

Performance in CAF competitions

Performance at the WAFU Club Championship

National level

Statistics
Best position: Second round (continental)
Best position at cup competitions: Intermediate Round (continental)
Highest number of goals in a season: 46 (national)
Highest number of points in a season: 67 (national)
Total goals scored at a cup final: 4 – all in 2000
Total matches played at the CAF Champions League: 13
Total matches played at home: 7
Total matches played away: 6
Total number of wins at the CAF Champions League: 3
Total home wins: 3
Total draws at the CAF Champions League: 5
Total home draws: 3
Total away draws: 3
Total number of goals scored at the CAF Champions League: 8
Total number of goals scored at the African cup competition: 1

Current and former players
Mamadou Diallo
 Makhete Diop
Pape Hamadou N'Diaye
 Joseph Niouky (played from 2006 until 2010)
 Makhtar Thioune

See also
Autonomous Port of Dakar (Port autonome de Dakar), the main Port of Dakar

Notes

External links
 Port Autonome at Soccerway
 Continental tournaments

 
Ligue 2 (Senegal) clubs
Football clubs in Senegal
Sports clubs in Dakar
Works association football teams